Jewish education (Chinuch) is the transmission of the tenets, principles, and religious laws of Judaism. Known as the "people of the book", Jews value education, and the value of education is strongly embedded in Jewish culture. Judaism places a heavy emphasis on Torah study, from the early days of studying the Tanakh.

History 
Jewish education has been valued since the birth of Judaism. In the Hebrew Bible Abraham is lauded for instructing his offspring in God's ways. One of the basic duties of Jewish parents is to provide for the instruction of their children as set forth in the first paragraph of the Shema Yisrael prayer: “Take to heart these instructions with which I charge you this day. Impress them upon your children. Recite them when you stay at home and when you are away, when you lie down and when you get up. Bind them as sign on your hand and let them serve as a symbol on your forehead; inscribe them on the doorposts of your house and your gates” (Deut. 6:6-9). Additionally, children are advised to seek the instruction of their parents: "Remember the days of old, consider the years of many generations; ask thy father, and he will declare unto thee, thine elders, and they will tell thee" (Deut. 32:7). The Book of Proverbs also contains many verses related to education: “My son, do not forget my teaching, but let your mind retain my commandments; For they will bestow on you length of days, years of life and well-being“ (Prov. 3:1-2).

Elementary school learning was considered compulsory by Simeon ben Shetah in 75 BCE and by Joshua ben Gamla in 64 CE. The education of older boys and men in a beit midrash can be traced back to the period of the Second Temple . The Talmud, states that children should begin school at six, and should not be kept from education by other tasks.

According to Judah ben Tema, “At five years the age is reached for studying Mikra, at ten for studying the Mishnah, at thirteen for fulfilling the mitzvoth, at fifteen for studying Talmud” (Avot 5:21). Mikra refers to the written Torah, Mishnah refers to the complementary oral Torah (the concise and precise laws dictating how the written Torah's commandments are achieved) and Talmud refers to comprehension of the oral and written law's unity and contemplation of the laws. The term "Talmud" used here is a method of study and is not to be confused by the later compilations by the same name. In keeping with this tradition, Jews established their own schools or hired private tutors for their children until the end of the 18th century. Schools were housed in annexes or separate buildings close to the synagogue.

Rabban Gamaliel, the son of Rabbi Judah Hanasi said that the study of the Torah is excellent when combined with Derech Eretz, worldly occupation, for toil in them both keeps sin out of one’s mind; But [study of the] Torah which is not combined with a worldly occupation, in the end comes to be neglected and becomes the cause of sin.

Formal Jewish education

Sex segregation 
Sex segregation in education was traditionally the norm, although many contemporary Jewish schools do not segregate students, outside of Orthodox or Ultra Orthodox communities. Historically, education for boys in yeshivas was primarily focused on the study of Jewish scriptures such as the Torah and Talmud, while girls obtained studies both in Jewish education as well as broader secular studies.

Primary schooling 
The Talmud (Tractate Bava Bathra 21a) attributes the institution of formal Jewish education to the first century sage Joshua ben Gamla. Prior to this, parents taught their children informally. Ben Gamla instituted schools in every town and made education compulsory from the age of 6 or 7. The Talmud attaches great importance to the "Tinokot shel beth Rabban" (the children [who study] at the Rabbi's house), stating that the world continues to exist for their learning and that even for the rebuilding of the Temple in Jerusalem, classes are not to be interrupted (Tractate Shabbat 119b).

The yeshiva

History 
In Mishnaic and Talmudic times young men were attached to a beth din (court of Jewish law), where they sat in three rows and progressed as their fellow students were elevated to sit on the court.

After the formal court system was abolished, yeshivot became the main places for Torah study. The Talmud itself was composed largely in the yeshivot of Sura and Pumbedita in Babylonia, and the leading sages of the generation taught there. 
Until the 19th century, young men generally studied under the local rabbi, who was allocated funds by the Jewish community to maintain a number of students. The Hasidic masters and the Lithuanian rabbi Chaim Volozhin both founded centralised yeshivot; see Yeshiva#History.

Modern yeshivas 
Yeshivot have remained of central importance in the Orthodox community to this day; see Yeshiva#Contemporary Orthodox yeshivas. Presently, there are numerous yeshivot - particularly in the US and Israel, but, in general, wherever there is an established Orthodox community. In the 20th century, Hesder (Israeli Religious Zionist) and Modern Orthodox yeshivot were also founded. 
In all of these communities, yeshiva study is common, with young men (and women in a midrasha) spending several years post high school studying Torah. In the Haredi / Hasidic communities, this study often spans decades; see kollel.

Non-orthodox streams have yeshivot also, although these are intended (almost entirely) for Rabbinic preparation. Their syllabi similarly depart from the traditional.

Secular education emphasis 
In the 21st century, critics in both the United States and Israel have protested that (some) Haredi and Hasidic yeshivas are teaching religious studies to the exclusion of secular subjects such as mathematics and science. This Haredi aversion to secular studies manifests differently in Israel and outside Israel.

In America, some yeshivas of Haredi (Ultra-Orthodox), but non-Hasidic (Lithuanian) identity, offer state-compliant secular education curriculums. For example, Yeshiva Torah Vodaas runs a "NYS Board of Regents certified High School" with a contemporary curriculum "in compliance with the latest Common Core standards."

American Hasidic yeshivas, however, from elementary to high school levels, have a long history of shying away from all but the most rudimentary exposure to secular studies. For example, when several decades ago Rabbi Shlomo Halberstam of the Bobov Hasidic dynasty was met with intensified calls for higher-level secular education from Hasidic parents of Bobov-affiliated yeshivas, Halberstam rejected their pleas and stated that on principle he would not compromise "even if it means that I will have no more than one student." Critics such as Naftuli Moster have worked to promote the adoption of national or state standards on secular subjects by such yeshivas. In 2019, 99 percent of Hasidic boys in New York who took state standardized tests in reading and math failed them.

Following a New York Times investigation into the quality of education in Hasidic Jewish private schools in 2022 that revealed that many of the schools taught only rudimentary English and math and virtually no science or history, concerns were raised by some local politicians as to the standard of secular education provided. Particular criticism followed accounts of corporal punishment in the schools. The Times investigation revealed that the Hasidic community operates more than 100 all-boys schools across Brooklyn and the lower Hudson Valley, which have received more than $1 billion in government money in the previous four year period. These schools typically provide only 90 minutes a day of secular instruction, four days per week, and only for boys aged 8 to 12. More than 99 percent of students who took standardized tests in 2019 failed, according to state data.

The educational philosophy of Hasidic and most non-Hasidic Haredi yeshivas in Israel is largely similar to that of their American counterparts, i.e. opposed to secular studies, no path to attaining a Bagrut certificate. As of 2017, percentage of Haredi girls taking matriculation exams was 51% (up from 31% a decade prior; however, for boys it was only 14% (down from 16%), since Orthodox yeshivot mostly ignore core subjects. About 8 percent of Haredi students pass the exam. Miriam Ben-Peretz, professor emeritus of education at the University of Haifa, and winner of the 2006 Israel Prize notes: “More and more Israeli students don’t have any foundation of knowledge, any basics — not in math, not in English, not in general...things have to change." Some Israelis who have been educated in Haredi yeshivas have established Leaving for Change (LFC), an organization seeking to sue the government for alleged failure to enforce Israel's law for compulsory education. There is a similar organization in America called YAFFED (Young Advocates for Fair Education).

Jewish schools 
The phenomenon of the Jewish day school is of relatively common origin. Until the 19th and 20th century, boys attended the cheder (literally "room," since it was in the synagogue, which historically was a building with a bet midrash being the only room) or talmud Torah, where they were taught by a melamed tinokos (children's teacher).

The first Jewish day school developed in Germany, largely in response to the higher emphasis in general on secular studies. In the past, an apprenticeship was sufficient to learn a profession, or alternatively several years in a gymnasium could prepare one adequately for university. Rabbis who pioneered Jewish day schools included Rabbi Shimson Raphael Hirsch, whose Realschule in Frankfurt am Main served as a model for numerous similar institutions. Jews have also been disproportionately engaged in the building of academic institutions of education and in promoting teaching as a professional career. Three of the past four presidents of the American Federation of Teachers have been Jews: starting with Albert Shanker, her successor Sandra Feldman, all the way to current AFT president, Randi Weingarten.

In 2007, there were over 750 day schools in the United States and 205,000 students in those schools. Beyond those students, hundreds of thousands (~250,000) of Jewish children attend supplementary religious, Hebrew, and congregational schools.

Girls' education 

Formal Jewish girls' education is a twentieth century phenomenon. Prior to this women learned basic Jewish concepts and halakha in an informal setting with parents or other family members, apart from occasional instances where women learned Torah intensively.

One of the main arguments for this educational inequality of discouraging women from learning Torah related topics is found in the Talmud. According to Rabbi Eliezer in Tractate Sotah: 'If a man teaches his daughter Torah, it's as if he's teaching her foolishness.' Traditional religious views were that women were not on the same intellectual level as men, and therefore were unable to understand the intricacies of the Torah and Talmud.

This situation changed largely due to the efforts of Sara Schnirer, who founded the first Jewish girls' school Bais Yaakov in Kraków in Poland in 1918. leading to the formation of the Beth Jacob Movement. From the 19th century onwards, public education became compulsory in most of Europe, and Jewish schools were established in order to maintain educational control over Jewish children. 

In the Beth Jacob system, women primarily learn Torah, and also some halacha (Jewish religious law), but not the Talmud. This means that they are not only taught Torah but are also taught 'the lifestyle of being a homemaker, and supporting their husbands who want to learn in yeshiva all day.' 

Girls in the United States at this time were often educated at public schools together with boys, and they received their Jewish education through programs at synagogues and Sunday schools, as Jewish day schools were less common.

After the end of World War II, women moved into Jewish studies research and teaching. The balance of education for women and men has made great strides in equality in Jewish schools.

Informal Jewish education

Youth groups 
Recent[when?] studies estimate a population of 650,000 Jewish middle and high school students.[dead link] Most of these attend Jewish youth groups or participate in activities funded by Jewish youth organizations Jewish youth organizations. Many of these are Zionist youth movements. The various organizations differ in political ideology, religious affiliation, and leadership structure, although they all tend to be characterized by a focus on youth leadership.

The Conservative movement has USY - United Synagogue Youth. The Modern Orthodox movement has NCSY - formerly National Conference of Synagogue Youth. BBYO is a non-denominational group, though most Jews associate it with the Reform movement. The North American Federation of Temple Youth, known as NFTY, is the organized youth movement of Reform Judaism in North America. Funded and supported by the Union for Reform Judaism, NFTY exists to supplement and support Reform youth groups at the synagogue level. About 750 local youth groups affiliate themselves with the organization, comprising over 8,500 youth members.

Summer camps 
Jewish summer camps are a tool for creating ties with a particular denomination of Judaism and/or orientation to Israel. Camps are sponsored by the Orthodox, Conservative, Reconstructionist, and Reform movement, by Jewish community centers, and by Zionist movements such as Young Judaea, Betar, Habonim Dror, Hashomer Hatzair and B'nei Akiva. Over 70,000 campers participate in over 150 non-profit Jewish summer camps, especially in the United States. In addition, the Foundation for Jewish Camp estimates that these camps are staffed by over 8,500 Jewish college-aged counselors. American-style Jewish summer camps can also be found in other countries, such as Camp Kimama in Israel. Outside the United States, similar camps are generally organized by various philanthropic organizations and local Jewish youth movements.

The Camp Ramah network, affiliated with Conservative Judaism runs camps in North America where youngsters experience traditional Shabbat observance, study Hebrew and observe the laws of kashrut.

The Union for Reform Judaism runs the largest Jewish camping system in the world, the URJ Camp & Israel Programs. They operate 13 summer camps across North America, including a sports specialty camp, teen leadership institute and programs for youth with special needs, as well as a number of Israel travel programs. Participants in these programs observe Shabbat, engage in programming about Jewish values and history, and partake in typical summer camp activities including athletics, creative arts and color war.

Student organizations 
Much informal Jewish education is organized on university campuses. This is often supported by national organizations, such as Hillel (United States) or the Union of Jewish Students (United Kingdom), or by international organizations such as the World Union of Jewish Students and the European Union of Jewish Students.

The Rohr Jewish Learning Institute in partnership with The Chabad on Campus International Foundation, manages the Sinai Scholars Society, an integrated fellowship program for college campus students comprising Torah study, social activities, and national networking opportunities.

Drama-based education 
One of the earliest examples of drama-based Jewish education is the theatrical works of Rabbi Moshe Chaim Luzatto (Ramchal 1707-1746, b. Italy), who wrote plays with multiple characters on Jewish themes. While the use of such plays was probably rare in traditional Jewish education, the Etz Chaim school of Jerusalem reportedly staged plays in the 1930s.

From the 20th century onwards drama has been used as an educational tool. Programs such as Jewish Crossroads by Shlomo Horwitz provide educational theater in schools and synagogues in various English-speaking countries. The Lookstein Center at Bar-Ilan University, a think tank geared to Jewish educators in the Diaspora, lists many drama-related programs on their website for use of teachers in the classroom.

Sports-based education 
Sports is another vehicle to connect Jewish youth to Judaism and Israel. Bring It In - Israel offers a sports volunteering program in Israel that cultivates a cadre of young leaders who return to their communities to promote interest in Israel and Judaism. The perceived role of sports as a historical avenue was crucial for Jewish people to overcome social, religious and cultural obstacles toward their participation in secular society (especially in Europe and the United States).

References

Sources
The World of the Jewish Youth Movement'' by Daniel Rose - on movements and informal education

External links
 American Jewish University
 NewCAJE: Re-Imaging Jewish Education for the 21st Century
 The Lookstein Center for Jewish Education of Bar-Ilan University whose purpose is to keep the story of Soviet Jewry alive
 Shalom Hartman Institute
 The Jewish Teacher Project
 The Jewish Education Project
 

 

Jewish youth organizations